Edward Thorne may refer to:

 Edward Thorne (politician) (1746–1820), political figure in Nova Scotia
 Edward Thorne (naval officer) (1923–2013), Royal New Zealand Navy officer
 Edward Thorne (musician) (1834–1916), English classical organist